Vankleek Hill is a town in Champlain Township in Eastern Ontario. It has a population of 1,996.

The town was named after Simeon Vankleek, a United Empire Loyalist who settled there near the end of the 18th century. The agricultural-based community became a thriving community in the 1890s and still retains many of the buildings and structures of the time. As such it is called the gingerbread (the wood carvings on the eaves of one's roof) capital of Ontario.

History
Simeon Van Kleeck and his wife Cecilia Jaycox arrived in Nova Scotia from the former British Province of New York in 1783. Simeon, of Dutch descent, was a demobilized officer who had supported the British crown during the American Revolution. His wife Cecilia had witnessed her brother's capture and execution for his British allegiance.

As a United Empire Loyalist, Simeon was to receive land in payment for his services, and he applied for his grant several times. The legend is that while he waited for a decision, he sighted high ground on a plane of flat land south of the Ottawa River. Simeon and his son Simeon Jr. settled c.1797 on Concession IV, Lots 7,8, and 9, Hawkesbury Township. Today this is the location of Vankleek Hill.

Vankleek Hill prosperity began with the VanKleeck's family inn that served travellers going to and from the Ottawa River port of L’Original to southern ports on the St. Lawrence River. Soon tradesmen and merchants were established at the four corners where today Highway 34 intersects with Main Street (County Road 10).

Since 1998 Vankleek Hill is one of four municipalities that make up the Township of Champlain that includes L’Original, and the townships of Longueuil and West Hawkesbury. These four communities were first historically linked through family and social ties, farming and commerce; and today with a new common municipal government.

Gingerbread Capital of Ontario
Vankleek Hill was named Ontario's Gingerbread Capital in 2003. Gingerbread is the woodwork that adds architectural detail to building exteriors and interiors. The porches, windows, gables, and rooflines of over 250 homes in Vankleek Hill contain Victorian era decorative gingerbread elements. Builders ordered millwork through catalogues. By the 1890s, the new Vankleek Hill Manufacturing Company on Mill Street created and sold decorative shingles, latticework, verge boards, columns, spindles and brackets.

The backdrop for the gingerbread is red brick, a hallmark of Vankleek Hill Victorian and Edwardian period buildings. The local rich clay deposits were kilned to a distinctive soft red brick by at least three local brick factories active here in the 19th and early 20th centuries.

Tourism
In Vankleek Hill two trompe-l’oeil murals at the corner of Home Avenue and Main Street East, and on the north side of the historic Methot building on High Street depict early Vankleek Hill storefronts, trades, community life, and the annual Vankleek Hill Agricultural Society Fair. A third mural at the corner of Main Street East and Highway 34 celebrates activities, landscapes, buildings that came to life in this agricultural community. There is a tribute to the military aid received during the 1998 Ice Storm.

All three murals depict true-life Vankleek Hill people, and were created by regional artists Elizabeth Skelly and Odile Têtu.

A ‘secret’ mural of Magical Beasts is located on a wall east of the Firehall and was created by local artist Susan Jephcott with her friends.

The Vankleek Hill & District Historical Society threads the telling of local history through the buildings and their architecture. Home Avenue, contains the remains of the significant Higginson Tower, originally a windmill built in c.1832, that sits next to the once Higginson home c.1850.

Next door is St. John Anglican Church celebrating 150 years. Derby Street brings the charming and colourful log home constructed c.1828 by Stephen Cafs, a United Empire Loyalist. Main Street East contains the Georgian stone home built c.1828 by blacksmith Julius Blaisdell, and several Victorian red brick homes that housed physicians such as 127, and 151 Main Street East. Look across the street from the red brick of 151 to find the mirror image in painted pine.

Vankleek Hill hosts several annual cultural events including a Victorian Christmas Home Tour on the first Saturday in November, the May Show Festival during the long weekend in May and an annual Fiddling, Step-dancing and Squaredancing Competition on the July 1 weekend, every second year Family Local History Day in the fall and Yes Women Can! women's show in the spring, and the Vankleek Hill Fair  held annually in August. A Festival of Flavours takes place the third Sunday in September. In 2008, a dining table stretched the length of Main Street where visitors could enjoy local foods from chefs cooking at their booths along the street. Four historical murals painted on some of the town's heritage buildings are a popular tourist attraction.

Each March hockey players from Ontario, Quebec and the north-eastern United States gather in Vankleek Hill for a 4 on 4 hockey tournament known as the Pond Rocket Cup.  Teams are made up of former junior, college and pro players, but also feature local players.  The PRC as it is known, has become the social event of the winter in the area.

The community also has cross-country skiing trails and has many beautiful murals, which decorate downtown buildings.

The town is known for its stately Victorian brick homes. In celebration of this architecture, the Victorian Christmas Home Tour is a popular event, taking place most recently November 6, 2010.

The town is the home of Beau's All Natural Brewing Company, an award-winning craft brewery that supplies pubs, restaurants, and vendors across Canada.

Vankleek Hill is currently home to a community garden, which has two acres of organically grown produce being harvested by residents within a few steps of Main Street. The town has one set of traffic lights, parks, an arena, and a fairground.

Education
The Vankleek Hill area supports several educational facilities. At the elementary level, there are three different schools which children are able to attend:
 Pleasant Corners Public School (PCPS), an English language school and part of the Upper Canada District School Board
 St. Jude Catholic School, a half-English, half-French school that is part of the Catholic District School Board of Eastern Ontario
 St. Gregoire (École Saint-Grégoire de Vankleek Hill), a fully French-language school and part of the Conseil scolaire de district catholique de l'Est ontarien.

The town's secondary school, Vankleek Hill Collegiate Institute (VCI), is the only English speaking High School in the region and, like PCPS, is also part of the Upper Canada District School Board.

Vankleek Hill can boast of having the longest running Nursery School/Daycare in the area. The now Champlain Day Nursery opened in September 1972 and has been in operation since.  Many of Vankleek Hill and area children have attended at one time or another and now the third generation will be starting. The Champlain Township provides bilingual early childhood education services for children 18 months to 12 years old and employment for 25 adults in 7 different settings. In October 2007, a new daycare, Centre Éducatif Champlain Learning Centre opened in the St-Jude Catholic School and in March 2009, L'Atelier des Petits Champlain opened in the St-Jean-Baptiste school in L'Original.

Political representation
Vankleek Hill is now one of four wards in Champlain Township. Champlain Township was created on January 1, 1998, as the result of municipal mergers. Champlain Township consists of these former municipalities:
The Town of Vankleek Hill,
The Village of L'Original,
The Township of West Hawkesbury and
The Township of Longueuil

Vankleek Hill is part of the Glengarry-Prescott-Russell federal riding.

Its federal Member of Parliament is Liberal Francis Drouin, a 31-year old political assistant and consultant, who won well over 50% of the vote.  At the provincial level, the riding is represented by Progressive Conservative MPP Stéphane Sarrazin

Local media
 VEF315 - (community radio)
 The Review

Sports teams
The local hockey team is the Vankleek Hill Cougars. Vankleek Hill also has a soccer league, the Champlain Soccer League, and it takes part in the Glengarry Soccer League. There is also a competitive hockey league for females, called the Hawkesbury/Champlain Girls Hockey Association.

Notable people
 Andrew Allen, goaltender and coach
 Connie Brown, NHL hockey player
 Don Cousens, politician; Ontario MPP and mayor of Markham, Ontario
 James B. Harkin, first commissioner of Dominion Parks Branch (birthplace)
 Mark Mahon, professional hockey player, coach and executive

See also

 List of unincorporated communities in Ontario

References

External links

 About Vankleek Hill: Website

Former towns in Ontario
Communities in the United Counties of Prescott and Russell